Kesha: My Crazy Beautiful Life is an American documentary television series about the life of singer Kesha. It aired on MTV for two seasons from April 23 to December 18, 2013.

Premise
The first season of Ke$ha: My Crazy Beautiful Life chronicles Kesha as she works through all the drama and adventures in both her personal and professional life over the course of two years, during her Get Sleazy Tour. Filmed by her brother Lagan Sebert and filmmaker Steven Greenstreet, it also encompasses the artist as she creates her second studio album, Warrior, and travels to various countries. Season 2 focuses primarily on Kesha's personal life, family dynamics and her trying to live a normal life during a much needed break from touring.

Cast

Main cast
 Kesha Sebert
 Pebe Sebert, Kesha's, Lagan's and Louie's mother
 Lagan Sebert, Kesha's older brother
 Louie Sebert, Kesha's younger brother

Supporting cast

 Max Bernstein
 Monica Cornia, Kesha's manager
 Rio Sebert, Kesha's three-year-old nephew and Lagan's son.
 Elias Mallin, Kesha's drummer
 Savannah, Kesha's best friend
 Tessa, Kesha's personal assistant
 Kalan, Kesha's cousin
 Nicole, Kesha's best friend and former assistant
 Sean, Kalan's fiancé
 Erica, Kesha's current assistant
 Steven Tyler

Episodes

Season 1 (2013)

Season 2 (2013)

Reception
The first season received mixed to positive reviews from critics. Metacritic, which gives reviews on a scale of one to 100, gave the show's first season a 55, which represents mixed or average reviews.

Controversy
The episode "A Warrior in the Making", which aired on May 21, 2013, was subject to criticism from the Parents Television Council due to a short scene in which Kesha supposedly tastes her own urine.

References

External links
 
 

2010s American documentary television series
2013 American television series debuts
2013 American television series endings
English-language television shows
Kesha
MTV reality television series
Television series based on singers and musicians